Antaeus Cinema Line is a Chinese cinema chain. It's the 13th largest exhibitor in China, with 1,200 screens in 227 theatres. It will be acquired by Perfect World.

References

Cinema chains in China
Chinese brands
Perfect World (company)